The Cumberland Theatre is Western Maryland's only regional professional theatre. It is located in Cumberland, Maryland, and stages a wide variety of musicals, plays, and dramas. It is a nonprofit organization, founded in 1988 and relocated in a formerly empty church in 1991.

History
Started as a project of Frostburg State University as a way to rejuvenate the summer theatre program, the theatre has since become independent from the University. Three of the founders were President Reinhard, Dr. Press and Dean Phillip Allen. It was incorporated in 1987, after Frostburg President Herb Rinehard expressed concern about the absence of summer theatre in Cumberland, which led to the cooperation of current theatre professor David Press and Dean Phillip Allen in founding the Cumberland theatre with a view to stimulating the local economy.  A board of Trustees was later established, chaired by Shirley Giarritta.  This board included members from the University, County and City administration, local businesses, and local residents.

The new Summer Theatre started in 1988 and 1989 as a rotating repertory theatre. Dr. Press acted as the Artistic Director as well as the Producing Director.  In the next season, Dean Allen assumed the role of Executive Director and the Producer while Dr. Press remained the Artistic Director. By the third season, the first full-time Producing Director and general manager, Mr. Pat Julian, was selected.

The theatre group performed in a borrowed storefront in the Schwarzenbach building on the Downtown Mall until 1991, when with assistance from the State of Maryland, Mrs. Giarriatta and Mr. Nicholas Giarriatta bought and renovated a disused Assembly of God church on Johnson street.  Mr. Don Whisted was engaged in 1992 as Artistic Director and remained in that position assisted for many years by Mr. Gary Goodson, Associate Producer, until his retirement in October, 2016. In 2003 William H. Macy, an Emmy Award winning actor, agreed to serve on the board of trustees. That same year the auditorium was named “The Nicholas and Shirley Giarritta Playhouse” to honour their many contributions to the theatre. The newly selected theatre management team consists of  Co-Artistic Directors Kimberli Rowley & Rhett Wolford.

Accommodation
The theatre's present location is at 101 North Johnson Street, formerly an Assembly of God Church.  The building houses the costume and scene shops and storage as well as the theatre house.  The theatre seats 198 patrons.
The Bev Walker Gallery serves as the lobby of the theatre with an art show on display with each production.

Management
The Cumberland Theatre is owned and operated by a volunteer board of trustees and is a 501 (c)(3) non-profit organisation.  The theatre is also supported by volunteers who serve on various committees and work as front of house staff.

The theatre is supported by donations from residents of the city of Cumberland, along with patrons such as Allegany County, Maryland Arts Council, Allegany County, the City of Cumberland, and the Allegany Arts Council.

Productions
The Cumberland Theatre produces a variety of plays.  The artistic director posts a brief synopsis of the play and usually a subjective rating, based on the language and themes contained in the shows.  The wide variety of genres include, comedy, drama, horror/thriller, musical, colonial, autobiographical, romance, crime, and mystery.  Over the years musicals have proven to be generally the most popular, followed by comedies and thrillers.  Furthermore, the theatre has produced many shows featuring stories specific to different minorities. Some examples are: The Diary of Anne Frank, Ain't Misbehavin', Hairspray, The All Night Strut, and To Kill A Mockingbird.

Past productions

References

External links
 Theatre website

Organizations based in Cumberland, MD-WV-PA
Culture of Cumberland, MD-WV-PA
Theatres in Maryland
Performing groups established in 1988
Theatre companies in Maryland
Buildings and structures in Cumberland, Maryland
Tourist attractions in Allegany County, Maryland
1988 establishments in Maryland